Painted Rock, on the Tule River Reservation in Tulare County, is an archaeological and sacred site of the Yokuts people.

References

External links
[https://digitalassets.lib.berkeley.edu/anthpubs/ucb/text/ucas068-003.pdf UNIVERSITY OF CALIFORNIA ARCHAEOLOGICAL SURVEY
NO. 68, PART III]
Painted Rock

Archaeological sites in California
Native American history of California
Yokuts